Peter Bruntnell (born 26 January 1962) is a British singer-songwriter born in Wellington, New Zealand.

Biography
Bruntnell's family is originally from Wales; His family moved to New Zealand when his father, Owen Bruntnell, was sent to work at the British High Commission in Wellington for four years. They returned to the UK when Bruntnell was a year old, and settled in Kingston upon Thames. His great great uncle was Australian politician Albert Bruntnell who emigrated from Wales in 1888. Bruntnell also lived in Vancouver, Canada for a time. In the early 1990s, Bruntnell returned to the UK and formed the band Milkwood, although he soon reverted to solo work and recordings with Matt Backer and Felix Harper as the Peter Bruntnell Combination. He was signed by Almo Sounds, who issued his debut album, Cannibal, in 1995. He recorded a second album for Almo, Camelot in Smithereens (1997), before moving to the Slow River label for his 1999 album Normal for Bridgwater. The album was highly recommended by VH1's Bill Flanagan and by Rolling Stones John Luerssen, and helped to establish Bruntnell with American audiences. The album was recorded with the help of musicians from Son Volt, a band with whom he has toured regularly in the United States.

In 2013, Loose Music released Bruntnell's Retrospective album, featuring music from all of his albums to date. The album was preceded by a single and accompanying video of a re-recording of the song "Played Out", featuring Rumer.

Musical style
Bruntnell's music is often referred to as Americana, although it has also been described as country rock and alternative country.

Discography

Albums
 Cannibal (1995), Almo Sounds – The Peter Bruntnell Combination
 Camelot in Smithereens (1997), Almo Sounds
 Normal for Bridgwater (1999), Slow River
 Ends of the Earth (2002), Black Porch – The Peter Bruntnell Combination
 Played Out (2004), Loose Music/Vinyl Junkie
 Ghost in a Spitfire (2005), Loose Music/Vinyl Junkie
 Peter and the Murder of Crows (2008), Loose Music
 Black Mountain U.F.O. (2011), Manhaton Records
 Ringo Woz Ere (2012), Domestico Records
 Retrospective (2013), Loose Music
 Nos Da Comrade (2016), Domestico Records
 Live in the Firth (2017), Domestico Records
 King of Madrid (2019), Domestico Records
 Journey To The Sun (2021), Domestico Records

Singles
"I Will, I Won't" (1995), Almo Sounds – The Peter Bruntnell Combination
"Astronaut" (1996), Almo Sounds – The Peter Bruntnell Combination
"Have You Seen That Girl Again" (1997), Almo Sounds
"Camelot in Smithereens" (1997), Almo Sounds
"Saturday Sam" (1997), Almo Sounds
"By the Time My Head Gets to Phoenix" (1999), Slow River
"Played Out (featuring Rumer)" (2013), Loose Music

References

External links
 Official Peter Bruntnell website

1964 births
Living people
English male singer-songwriters